Men's single skating was contested during the figure skating events at the 2002 Winter Olympics.

This men's Olympic event was last where the 6.0 system was used.

This individual event was structured in a similar manner to the pairs event, with a short program and a free skating. 28 skaters entered the short program, but only the top 24 competitors continued to the free skating.

The 1998 Olympic champion Ilia Kulik from Russia did not defend his title. Evgeni Plushenko from Russia was the reigning World Champion and also competed in Salt Lake City.

Russia earned the second gold in figure skating at the 2002 games after two medal events.

Short Program 
Short Program of men's single skating at the 2002 Winter Olympics was held on February 12.

Free Skating 
Free Skating of men's single skating at the 2002 Winter Olympics was held on February 14.

Total 
Alexei Yagudin won gold medal with 1.5 points (0.5 for SP and 1.0 for FS), Evgeni Plushenko became the silver medalist (4.0 points) and Timothy Goebel became bronze medalist (4.5 points). Takeshi Honda from Japan was second after the short program but became fourth in his free program and dropped to the fourth overall place.

Officials 
Referee:

  Sally-Anne Stapleford

Assistant Referee:

  Junko Hiramatsu

Judges:

  Wendy Langton
  Merja Kosonen
  Janet Allen
  Nicolae Bellu
  Yuri Kliushnikov
  Volker Waldeck
  Alexander Penchev
  Mieko Fujimori
  Evgenia Bogdanova
  Jarmila Portová (substitute)

References

External links 

 Men's Short Program at the IceCalc website
 Men's Free Skating at the IceCalc website
 Results of Men's Single Skating at the IceCalc website

Men
2002 in figure skating
Men's events at the 2002 Winter Olympics